Jermaine van Pijkeren (born 7 December 1991 in Rotterdam, Netherlands) is a Dutch footballer who played on the professional level for Dutch Eerste Divisie league club FC Dordrecht during the 2011-2012 season.

References

External links
voetbal international profile

Dutch footballers
Footballers from Rotterdam
FC Dordrecht players
Eerste Divisie players
1991 births
Living people
Association football forwards